Goniurosaurus is a genus of geckos, containing 25 species. Members are known by various names including ground geckos, tiger geckos, leopard geckos, and cave geckos Members of this genus are found in China, Japan, and Vietnam. For this reason they are known commonly as Asian geckos. They belong to the family Eublepharidae.

Diet
Geckos of the genus Goniurosaurus mainly feed on small insects.

Species
The following 26 species are recognized as being valid.

They can be divided into 4 species groups.

luii group:
Goniurosaurus araneus  (Vietnamese leopard gecko)
Goniurosaurus bawanglingensis 
Goniurosaurus catbaensis  (Cat Ba leopard gecko)
Goniurosaurus chengzheng  (Chengzheng cave gecko)
Goniurosaurus gezhi 
Goniurosaurus huuliensis 
Goniurosaurus luii 
Goniurosaurus liboensis 
Goniurosaurus kadoorieorum  (Kadoories's cave gecko)
Goniurosaurus kwangsiensis  (Guangxi cave gecko)

lichtenfelderi group:
Goniurosaurus hainanensis  
Goniurosaurus kwanghua 
Goniurosaurus lichtenfelderi  (Lichtenfelder's gecko)
Goniurosaurus sinensis 
Goniurosaurus zhoui  (Zhou's leopard gecko)

kuroiwae group:
Goniurosaurus kuroiwae  (Kuroiwa's ground gecko)
Goniurosaurus orientalis  (Spotted ground gecko)
Goniurosaurus sengokui  (Sengoku's gecko)
Goniurosaurus splendens  (Banded ground gecko)
Goniurosaurus toyamai  (Iheyajima leopard gecko)
Goniurosaurus yamashinae  (Yamashina's ground gecko)

yingdeensis group:
Goniurosaurus gollum  (Gollum leopard gecko)
Goniurosaurus varius 
Goniurosaurus wangshu  (Wangshu's leopard gecko)
Goniurosaurus yingdeensis  (Yingde leopard gecko)
Goniurosaurus zhelongi  (Zhe-long's leopard gecko)

References

Further reading
Barbour T (1908). "Some New Reptiles and Amphibians". Bull. Mus. Comp. Zool., Harvard College 51 (12): 315–325. (Goniurosaurus, new genus, p. 316).

External links

 ION
 Nomenclator Zoologicus

 
Lizard genera
Taxa named by Thomas Barbour